The 1997 Queensland Cup season was the 2nd season of Queensland's top-level statewide rugby league competition.

The competition, then known as the Channel Nine Queensland Cup for sponsorship purposes, was contested by fourteen teams over a 23-week-long season (including finals) which was eventually won by the Redcliffe Dolphins, who defeated the Easts Tigers 18–16 in the Grand Final at Suncorp Stadium.

Teams 
The number of teams in the Queensland Cup was reduced from 16 to 14 teams in 1997. The Burleigh Bears joined the competition, becoming the first Gold Coast-based side, while the Bundaberg Grizzlies, Mackay Sea Eagles and Sunshine Coast Falcons all withdrew.

Ladder

Finals series

Grand Final 

Redcliffe, who finished the season in 2nd place, qualified for their second straight Grand Final after going undefeated in the finals series. Easts, who finished 3rd, were defeated by Redcliffe in Week 3 of the finals and later qualified for the Grand Final after defeating Wests in the preliminary final. The two sides had first met in Round 13 of the regular season, with Easts running out 30-6 winners.

First half 
Easts opened the scoring through fullback Leon Yeatman, who broke a number of tackles on a 20-metre run to the try line. The Tigers would soon extend their lead through hooker Dale Williams, who dummied and broke a tackle to score. Following the try, Williams and Dolphins' hooker Richard Ackerman were both sent to the sin bin. Redcliffe got on the board just before the break, after five-eighth Anthony Singleton crossed easily from dummy half.

Second half 
After the intermission, an early Easts' try to winger Rob Braun extended the Tigers' lead to 10 points. With 14 minutes left to play, the Dolphins finally cracked the Tigers' defence, with second rower James Hinchey scoring out wide. With less than a minute to play and on the last tackle of the set, the Dolphins' spread it wide again to Hinchey, who scored his second try of the game and levelled the scores. After the siren had sounded, Singleton converted the try from close to the sideline to give Redcliffe their first Queensland Cup premiership.

Player statistics

Leading try scorers

Leading point scorers

End-of-season awards 
 Courier Mail Medal: Alan Wieland ( Wests Panthers)
 Rookie of the Year: Jason Campbell ( Wests Panthers)

See also 

 Brisbane Rugby League
 Queensland Cup
 Queensland Rugby League
 Winfield State League

References 

1997 in Australian rugby league
Queensland Cup
1997 in Papua New Guinean sport